Günter Neumann may refer to:

 Guenter Neumann (agricultural scientist) (born 1958)
 Günter Neumann (singer) (1913–1972), German singer, composer, lyricist and cabaretist
 Günter Neumann (philologist), German philologist (1920-2005)